Kamal Bhattacharjee (born 15 June 1936) is an Indian former cricketer. He played first-class cricket for Bengal and Railways.

See also
 List of Bengal cricketers

References

External links
 

1936 births
Living people
Indian cricketers
Bengal cricketers
Railways cricketers
People from Baharampur